Peter Gunn is a 1989 American made-for-television crime drama film directed by Blake Edwards. It was intended as a pilot to relaunch the Peter Gunn franchise starring Peter Strauss in the Craig Stevens role.

The pilot was aired on ABC on April 23, 1989, but a TV series was not commissioned. The idea of a revival began in 1977 when E. Jack Neuman was approached to script a made-for-TV movie to bring back Craig Stevens to the role. The project collapsed because of Blake Edwards' film schedule. Edwards once again announced a TV movie version in 1984 which was intended to star Robert Wagner in the role. This eventually became the 1989 TV movie with Peter Strauss.

Plot

Detective Peter Gunn is asked by a mob boss to find the murderer of a friend's brother. Although he is working outside from the mob, Gunn is nonetheless pursued by mobsters, the cops and interested women. The story heats up when Gunn finds information that suggests the cops are being framed.

Cast 
 Peter Strauss as Peter Gunn
 Peter Jurasik as Lt. Jacoby
 Barbara Williams as Edie Hart
 Jennifer Edwards as Maggie
 Pearl Bailey as Mother
 David Rappaport as Speck
 Charles Cioffi as Tony Amatti
 Richard Portnow as Spiros
 Debra Sandlund as Sheila
 Leo Rossi as Det. Russo
 Tony Longo as Sergeant Holstead
 Chazz Palminteri as Soldier

External links 
 
 

1989 television films
1989 films
1989 crime drama films
American crime drama films
Television films as pilots
Television pilots not picked up as a series
Films based on television series
Films directed by Blake Edwards
Films scored by Henry Mancini
Television films based on television series
Films with screenplays by Blake Edwards
1980s English-language films
American drama television films
1980s American films